The 2017–18 TCU Horned Frogs women's basketball team represented Texas Christian University in the 2017–18 NCAA Division I women's basketball season. The 2017–18 season was head coach Raegan Pebley's fourth season at TCU. The Horned Frogs were members of the Big 12 Conference and played their home games in Schollmaier Arena. This season TCU got back in the AP Top 25 for the first time since 2010. They finished the season 23–13, 9–9 in Big 12 play to finish in fifth place. They advanced to the semifinals of the Big 12 women's tournament where they lost to Baylor. They received an at-large bid to the Women's National Invitation Tournament where they defeated Lamar, Missouri State and New Mexico in the first, second and third rounds, and then South Dakota in the quarterfinals before losing to Indiana in the semifinals.

Roster

Schedule and results 

|-
!colspan=9 style="background:#4d1979; color:#FFFFFF;"| Exhibition

|-
!colspan=9 style="background:#4d1979; color:#FFFFFF;"| Non-Conference Games

|-
!colspan=9 style="background:#4d1979; color:#FFFFFF;"| Conference Games

|-
!colspan=9 style="background:#4d1979; color:#FFFFFF;"|  Big 12 Women's Tournament

|-
!colspan=9 style="background:#4d1979; color:#FFFFFF;"|  WNIT

Schedule and results from GoFrogs.com and ESPN.com

Rankings

See also 
 2017–18 TCU Horned Frogs men's basketball team

References 

TCU
TCU Horned Frogs women's basketball seasons
TCU